Peter Nolander (born January 29, 1981, in Karlstad) is a Swedish ice hockey defenceman, currently playing for Mora IK of the HockeyAllsvenskan. Nolander has also played in Elitserien teams Brynäs IF and AIK. His youth team is Arvika HC.

Career statistics

References

External links

1981 births
Living people
Brynäs IF players
Mora IK players
AIK IF players
Södertälje SK players
Swedish ice hockey defencemen
Sportspeople from Karlstad